Besh Barmag literally translated as Five Finger, is in Siazan District of Azerbaijan, not far from the Caspian Sea.

The mountain is a solid rock and is one of the most famous mountains in the Caucasus, known for its mythical stories. It is a sacred place for regular visitation by pilgrims.

Tide marks on the mount attest to meltwater inundation from the northern glacial ice caps and date back to the end of the last ice age. The tidelines confirm the theory of a Holocene outflow of meltwater from the Black Sea to the Mediterranean Sea, rather than a direct incursion of sea water into the Black Sea as a result of global sea level rise. Estimates of the increase in Caspian Sea level height are between + 20 and 30 meters.

References

External links

Mountains of Azerbaijan
Prehistoric sites in Azerbaijan
Archaeological sites in Azerbaijan
Megalithic monuments in Europe
Former populated places in the Caucasus